Tabaseyn-e Bala (also Romanized as Ţabaseyn-e Bālā; also known as Ţabaseyn-e ‘Olyā) is a village in Bandan Rural District, in the Central District of Nehbandan County, South Khorasan Province, Iran. At the 2006 census, its population was 1,044, in 183 families.

References 

Populated places in Nehbandan County